Johannes Brenner (16 January 1906 in Mäo – 9 September 1975 in Tallinn) was an Estonia football forward, who played for ESS Kalev Tallinn, Tallinna Jalgpalli Klubi and the Estonia national football team.

Football career
Brenner started playing football in 1920 for ESS Kalev Tallinn. He later also played for Tallinna Jalgpalli Klubi. Won two national championships, one with both clubs. Although he played as a forward or midfielder, he only scored one goal in his entire club career.

From 1923 to 1930, Brenner represented Estonian 16 times and scored four goals in those matches. He made the debut on 24 June 1923 in a friendly against Lithuania and became the youngest ever player (17 years and 159 days) to represent the nation. The record was eventually broken by Jarmo Ahjupera in 2001.

Retired at the age of 24 to concentrate on his career as a military pilot.

References

External links

1906 births
1975 deaths
Sportspeople from Paide
People from Kreis Jerwen
Estonian footballers
Estonia international footballers
JK Tallinna Kalev players
Olympic footballers of Estonia
Footballers at the 1924 Summer Olympics
Association football forwards
Soviet military personnel of World War II